The Wild Horse Border Crossing connects the cities of Havre, Montana with Medicine Hat, Alberta on the Canada–United States border. It is reached by Montana Secondary Highway 232 on the American side and Alberta Highway 41 on the Canadian side. In 2012, the US replaced its border inspection facilities, which were originally built in 1964.  Prior to that time, travelers were expected to proceed to a US Customs office in the city of Havre to report for inspection.  The crossing was established in 1925.  CBP and CBSA have had issues in coordinating the hours of operation at this crossing for several years.

The crossing is so remote that government housing for border officials exists next to the station. There is a local organization that is petitioning the border services agencies to make Wild Horse a 24-Hour border crossing.

See also
 List of Canada–United States border crossings

References

Canada–United States border crossings
1925 establishments in Alberta
1925 establishments in Montana
Transportation in Hill County, Montana
Buildings and structures in Hill County, Montana
Cypress County